Thomas Guinne Goode (December 1, 1938 – October 8, 2015) was an  American football offensive lineman, coach, and administrator from West Point, Mississippi.  He is probably best remembered as the long snapper on Jim O'Brien's game winning field goal in Super Bowl V that gave the Baltimore Colts a 16-13 victory over the Dallas Cowboys

Early life
Goode was born in West Point, Mississippi and attended West Point High School.  During his time in high school he played football, basketball and ran track.

College
He played his college football at Mississippi State, where he played both center and linebacker.  He was a three time All-SEC selection from 1958–1960 and the school's first Kodak All-American in 1960. He played in The Blue-Gray Game in 1960, the Senior Bowl in 1961, and the All-American game in 1961.  In addition to his athletic achievements he was also selected as Mr. Mississippi State, and named to Who's Who in American Colleges and Universities in 1961.  Following his college career he was drafted by both the Houston Oilers of the American Football League and the Detroit Lions of the National Football League.

Professional career
He spent four seasons with the Houston Oilers (1962–1965) before moving on to play for the Miami Dolphins for four seasons (1966–1969).  Goode was named the Dolphins' Most Valuable Player in 1967, the team's Most Outstanding Offensive Lineman in 1966 and 1969 and was named to the Pro Bowl in 1969. He played his final season with the Baltimore Colts in 1970 where he was the long snapper for Jim O'Brien's game-winning field goal in Super Bowl V, making him the first player from Mississippi State to win a Super Bowl.

Coaching career
Following his retirement from the NFL, Goode went on to serve as a coach at the college and professional levels.  He began his coaching career at Mississippi State as the offensive line coach from 1972–75. He then went on to be the offensive coordinator for the Calgary Stampeders of the Canadian Football League in 1976, and he served in the same capacity at Vanderbilt in 1977 before serving as the assistant head coach at Ole Miss from 1978 until 1982.  In 1983, he became the offensive line coach at Alabama in before returning to MSU, as the offensive line coach for a second time from 1984–89.  He then did a second stint as the offensive line coach at Vanderbilt from 1990 through 1991 before becoming the head coach and athletic director at East Mississippi Community College, where he served from 1991 until retiring in 2003.

Personal
Goode was married for over  19 years to the former Sonia Buffington Foster of Canton Mississippi, and they were parents of three boys, Tommy, Michael, and Brin Foster, and two girls, Lessie (Goode) Belk and Sandi (Foster) May. They also had seven grandchildren and three great-grandchildren.  His biography entitled Guts, God, and the Superbowl was published by Zondervan Publishing House in 1974 and written by Zola Levitt. He died on October 8, 2015.

See also
 List of American Football League players

References

1938 births
2015 deaths
American football centers
American football linebackers
Baltimore Colts players
Houston Oilers players
Miami Dolphins players
Mississippi State Bulldogs football players
American Football League All-Star players
People from West Point, Mississippi
Players of American football from Mississippi
American Football League players
East Mississippi Lions football coaches